William Hough (4 May 1892 – 13 April 1976) was an Irish hurler who played as a midfielder and as a centre-back for the Limerick senior team.

Hough first came to prominence as captain of the Waterford team for the 1913 championship. Two years later he made his debut for Limerick and was a regular member of the starting fifteen until his retirement after the 1929 championship. During that time he won two All-Ireland medals and three Munster medals. In 1918 Hough captained the team to the All-Ireland title.

At club level Humphreys played with Monagea, De La Salle and Newcastle West, winning a county championship medals with the latter two teams.

Early life

Willie Hough was born just outside Newcastlewest, County Limerick in 1892. He was born into a family that had a strong association with Gaelic games. His father, who excelled in both hurling and Gaelic football, was chairman of the West Limerick Board of the Gaelic Athletic Association from 1902 until 1910. Hough was educated locally and later attended the De La Salle College in Waterford where he qualified as a national school teacher. After qualifying as a teacher Hough worked in Baltimore, County Cork.

Playing career

Club

Hough played his club hurling with a variety of clubs. During his studies in Waterford he played with the De La Salle club and enjoyed some success. He won back-to-back county titles with the club in 1913 and 1914. After moving to Cork Hough played with the UCC club. When he returned to his own native town he played with Newcastle West and enjoyed more success. He captured county titles with that club in 1917 and 1925.

Inter-county

Hough first came to prominence on the inter-county scene, not with his own native-county but, with Waterford. In 1913 he was handed the captaincy of the inter-county team. Waterford, however, were eliminated from the provincial championship at the first hurdle at the hands of Tipperary. After moving to Cork Hough was invited to join the Cork senior team, however, he declined.

In 1915 Hough made his debut with the Limerick inter-county team. Limerick’s hurling fortunes were on the way up at the time. In 1917 Hough lined out in his first Munster final with Tipperary providing the opposition. Tipp were the All-Ireland champions, however, Limerick took the game by the scruff of the neck. At the final whistle both sides had recorded 3-4 and a replay was necessary. Tipp made no mistake in the final and walloped Limerick by 6-4 to 3-1.

In 1918 Hough was appointed captain of the Limerick senior hurling team. For the second year in-a-row Limerick reached the Munster final. Clare provided the opposition on that occasion, however, Hough’s side were the better team on the day. The final score of 11-3 to 1-2 tells its own story as Hough collected his first Munster title. The subsequent All-Ireland final saw Limerick take on Wexford. The first-half saw Hough’s side go on a goal-scoring spree as Limerick took a half-time lead of 5-4 to 0-2. The goals continued in the second-half as Limerick won the game by 9-5 to 1-3, giving Hough his first All-Ireland medal. Hough's two wing backs were Jack Keane and Jimmy Humphries. This line was called the Hindenburg half back line after the famous WW1 German general.

In 1919 Limerick reached their third consecutive Munster final. Cork were the opponents on that occasion, however, the All-Ireland champions were humbled with a 3-5 to 1-6 defeat. Hough’s side were heavily beaten by Cork again in the 1920 provincial decider.

In 1921 the Munster championship was affected by political strife. Because of this only Cork and Limerick participated with both sides contesting the provincial final for the third consecutive year. Hough’s side avenged the defeats of the previous two years by beating Cork by 5-2 to 1-2. It was Hough’s second Munster title. The subsequent All-Ireland final pitted Limerick against Dublin. Once again, Limerick went on a goal-scoring rampage with captain Bob McConkey capturing four goals in all. Limerick went on to win the game by 8-5 to 3-2, giving Hough a second All-Ireland medal.

Limerick surrendered their Munster crown to Tipperary after a replay in 1922, however, they reversed that defeat in 1923 with Hough adding a third Munster medal to his collection. He later lined out in his third All-Ireland final as Galway provided the opposition. In spite of Galway playing in the very first All-Ireland final they had yet to win a title. Limerick looked likely to capture a third All-Ireland title in six years, however, for the very first time the All-Ireland title went to a team from Connacht.

The next few years saw Limerick go into decline in Munster. Hough retired from inter-county activity in 1926. He returned three years later in 1929 for a championship match against Waterford. His side was defeated on that occasion bringing the final curtain down on his inter-county career.

Post-playing career

In retirement Hough took up refereeing and distinguished himself in National Hurling League and Munster championship games. The highlight of his refereeing career came when he took charge of an All-Ireland semi-final between Kilkenny and Galway.

Hough also excelled as an administrator within the GAA. He was vice-chairman of the West Limerick Board from 1924 until 1928. In 1936 he was appointed treasurer of the Munster Council. He remained in that position, unopposed, until his retirement in 1962.

Willie Hough died in 1976.

Sources

 Corry, Eoghan, The GAA Book of Lists (Hodder Headline Ireland, 2005).
 Fullam, Brendan, Captains of the Ash (Wolfhound Press, 2002).

References

External links
 Munster final winning teams
 Limerick GAA honours

 

1892 births
1976 deaths
Newcastlewest hurlers
De La Salle hurlers
UCC hurlers
Waterford inter-county hurlers
Limerick inter-county hurlers
All-Ireland Senior Hurling Championship winners
Alumni of De La Salle Teacher Training College, Waterford